This is a list of medical museums.

Armenia 

 Armenian Medical Museum

Austria
 Memorial Site Hartheim Castle, Alkoven
 Narrenturm (asylum)

Australia
 Medical History Museum, University of Melbourne

Azerbaijan
 Azerbaijan Medicine Museum, Baku

Belgium
 Musee de la Medecine, Brussels

Bulgaria 

 Museum of Medicine History

Canada
 Banting House, London, Ontario
 Canadian Medical Hall of Fame, London, Ontario
 Hillary House and Koffler Museum of Medicine, Aurora, Ontario
 Maude Abbott Medical Museum, Montreal, Quebec
 Museum of Health Care, Kingston, Ontario
 Museum of Vision Science, Waterloo, Ontario

Cyprus 

 Kyriazis Medical Museum

Denmark
 Medical Museion, University of Copenhagen

Ecuador 

 Ecuador National Museum of Medicine

Egypt 

 Qasr Al-Eini Museum

Finland 

 Helsinki University Museum

France
 Museum of the History of Medicine, Paris

Germany 
  (German Medical History Museum), Ingolstädter Alte Anatomie (Old Anatomy Building), Ingolstadt, Bavaria

Greece 

 Hippocratic Museum

Hungary
 Semmelweis Museum of Medical History (Semmelweis Orvostörténeti Múzeum) in the former home of Ignaz Semmelweis

Iceland 

 Icelandic Phallological Museum

India 

 Ibn Sina Academy of Medieval Medicine and Sciences
 Manipal Museum of Anatomy and Pathology (MAP)

Iran
 Iranian National Museum of Medical Sciences History

Italy
 Museo di storia della medicina, Rome
 MUSME, Padova
 Chieti Museum of Biomedical Sciences

Japan
 Cannabis Museum (Japan)
 Daiichi Sankyo Kusuri Museum
 Medical Museum of Kawasaki Medical School
 Medical Science Museum, Tokyo
 Meguro Parasitological Museum
 Museum of Health and Medicine, Tokyo
 National Hansen's Disease Museum (Japan)
 Poison Gas Museum

Latvia
 Pauls Stradins Museum of the History of Medicine, Riga

Mexico
 Museum of Mexican Medicine, Mexico City
Dr. Ángel Óscar Ulloa Gregori Museum Room, at the Autonomous University of Nuevo León, in Monterrey
Palace of the Inquisition

Norway 

 Norwegian Museum of Science and Technology

Portugal
 Museum of Hospital Rovisco Pais, Tocha - Cantanhede City

 Madeira Optics Museum

Russia
 Medical History Museum, Tyumen
 Russian Museum of Military Medicine, Saint Petersburg

South Korea 

 The Museum of Medicine

Spain
 Basque Museum of the History of Medicine and Science

Sweden
 Medical History Museum, Sahlgrenska University Hospital, Gothenburg

Switzerland
 Medizinhistorisches Museum, Zürich

Syria 

 Nur al-Din Bimaristan

Thailand 

 Siriraj Medical Museum

United Kingdom
 Tayside Medical History Museum, University of Dundee, Scotland
 Thackray Medical Museum, Leeds

United States
 Dittrick Museum of Medical History, Cleveland
 Indiana Medical History Museum, Indianapolis
International Museum of Surgical Science, Chicago
 Medical History Museum, Dr. Christopher S. Best House and Office, Middleburgh, New York
Mütter Museum, Philadelphia
National Museum of Health and Medicine, Silver Spring, Maryland

Uzbekistan 

 The Museum of Health Care of Uzbekistan

See also
 History of medicine
 Hospital museum

Medical history
Medical museums